Blackstrap was a federal electoral district in Saskatchewan, Canada, that had been represented in the House of Commons of Canada since 1997.  It is named for Blackstrap Lake.  The riding was abolished prior to the 2015 Canadian federal election.

Geography
The riding included the southeast quadrant of the city of Saskatoon and extended south to Elbow, southeast to Bladworth, and east to Jansen.

History
The electoral district was created in 1996 from Saskatoon—Dundurn and portions of Mackenzie, Moose Jaw—Lake Centre and Saskatoon—Humboldt ridings.

For the 2015 Canadian Federal election, the riding was abolished, with the Saskatoon portion becoming part of Saskatoon—Grasswood, while the rural portion became part of Moose Jaw—Lake Centre—Lanigan.

Members of Parliament

This riding has elected the following members of the House of Commons:

Election results

    

Note: Conservative vote is compared to the total of the Canadian Alliance vote and Progressive Conservative vote in 2000 election.

Note: Canadian Alliance vote is compared to the Reform vote in 1997 election.

See also
 List of Canadian federal electoral districts
 Past Canadian electoral districts

References
 
 
 Expenditures – 2008
 Expenditures – 2004
 Expenditures – 2000
 Expenditures – 1997
 Website of the Parliament of Canada
 Map of Blackstrap riding archived by Elections Canada

Notes

Former federal electoral districts of Saskatchewan
Politics of Saskatoon